Berwick Academy is a college preparatory school located in South Berwick, Maine. Founded in 1791, it is the oldest educational institution in Maine and one of the oldest private schools in North America. The school sits on an 80-acre, 11-building campus on a hill overlooking the town, near the border between Maine and New Hampshire. Approximately 565 students in grades Pre-K through 12 (and post-grad) attend this coeducational day and boarding school. The majority of students commute to Berwick from approximately 60 communities in the surrounding regions of southern Maine, southeastern New Hampshire and northeastern Massachusetts. There are also several international residential students.

History 

Berwick Academy was founded in 1791 when citizens of Berwick, York, and Wells (then villages in the District of Maine within the recently founded state of Massachusetts) raised $500 to teach languages, liberal arts and sciences to "the youth in this part of the country."  Chartered by Massachusetts Governor John Hancock later that year and armed with a classical educational mission, the school opened in a small hip-roofed Georgian building on land donated by Judge Benjamin Chadbournes.  Today known as The 1791 House, the building was relocated to the current campus in 1971 and is the oldest school structure in the United States still utilized today.

From its founding the school contracted with the town of South Berwick to educate local students, serving both as a private college preparatory school and the de facto local public.  As the town grew and industrialized, the school's dual role necessitated campus expansion. A new Academy building was built in 1830, and destroyed by fire in 1851.  Its successor, designed by architect Richard Upjohn, was superseded by the William Hayes Fogg Memorial Building in 1894. Designed by George Albert Clough in the Richardsonian Romanesque style, landscaped by Frederick Law Olmsted, and built complete with electricity and state-of-the-art science labs, it remains a focal point of the modern campus, housing the majority of Upper School history, English, and foreign language classrooms.

In 1955, the contract with South Berwick terminated and the school reverted to a purely private "prep school," featuring boarding for boys, a day department for girls, and college preparation on a classical model for both.  Considerable physical expansion during this period included the acquisitions of surrounding homes for dormitories and of adjacent lands for playing fields.

In the 1970s, the burdensome cost of housing students and the increasing suburbanization of northern New England resulted in a further transformation from boarding academy to country day school.  A Middle School was founded in 1971 and a Lower School in 1977; boarding was discontinued in 1976 and the dormitory-homes sold or converted to educational uses. In the subsequent decades the school's enrollment, endowment, and physical plant have steadily increased, with the addition of Jackson Library, the Jeppesen Science and Math center, the Baldwin Arts Center, and a sports complex, among other facilities.  The school has come to occupy a unique academic position in between the 18th century American college preparatory school and the 19th Century progressive country day school. In 2017 it was announced that the school would begin a small residential program, beginning in the 2018-2019 school year.

Administration 
Berwick is governed by a 23-member Board of Trustees, with a Head of School in charge of day-to-day operation and fundraising.  The three subsidiary schools are headed by Division Directors. The Upper School has advisors, class advisors, Grade Deans and an Assistant Director, and the Middle School a Dean of Students.

Campus 
Berwick Academy is situated on an 80 acre campus in the town of South Berwick, Maine, high above the Salmon Falls River.  The campus consists of eleven major buildings, including the Fogg Memorial Building (home of the Upper School), Burleigh-Davidson Building (home of admissions and administration), the 1791 Building (finance and facilities), the Jackson Library, Jeppersen Science Center.

Gallery

Academics 

The Berwick curriculum balances tradition with innovation and prepares students for college while ensuring they become ethical citizens that possess "virtue and useful knowledge."  In keeping with the school's classical mission subjects of study are diverse and include Liberal Arts, Sciences, Fine Arts, Music and Mathematics.  Berwick has a student-teacher ratio of 8:1 and an average class size of 14 students.

The Academy is divided into three schools: the Lower School (grades PreK–4), the Middle School (grades 5–8) and the Upper School (grades 9–PG).  The academic calendar is divided into trimesters; students typically take year-long classes, with some trimester-length elective classes in the Upper School.  Students follow a rigorous academic program combining classical education and technology.

College placement 
Berwick Academy has traditionally prepared students for Bowdoin, Dartmouth, Colby and Bates colleges. While these relationships have continued, graduates now matriculate at a wide variety of highly selective colleges in the United States and abroad, including other Ivy League and Little Ivies, and the Ancient Universities of Great Britain.

Athletics 

Participation in sports is generally required for grade advancement. Middle School students are required to play three sports (an activity like "maker space" will also satisfy this requirement) during their course of study (one for each trimester), and participation in interscholastic athletics is required of Upper School students for at least one trimester per year. Waivers are given to Upper School students participating in a sport not offered at the school. Other after-school extracurricular activities, such as drama, dance, robotics, or independent research projects through the "Innovation Center", are offered as well. Lower school students participate in intramural sports.

Berwick currently fields teams in golf, soccer, field hockey, cross country, ice hockey, basketball, swimming, lacrosse, softball, tennis, baseball, and rowing. Teams compete in the Eastern Independent League (EIL) and New England Preparatory School Athletic Council (NEPSAC) are divided by gender and skill level.

Awards and recognition 
 In 2011, a student was selected as a winner of the Arts Olympiad to represent the state of Maine. A few other students were also invited to participate in the workshops at the World Children's Festival.
 In 2011 a team of seventh and eighth grade students won first place in the international Odyssey of the Mind competition, and bested teams from all over the globe.
 In 2013 Berwick Academy's innovation center placed third in the Follett Challenge and the school's library won $30,000 in prize money.
 In 2017, a Berwick Academy seventh grade student was Maine's representative at the National Geographic geography bee.

Notable alumni and faculty

Ichabod Goodwin (1794–1882), 27th Governor of New Hampshire
Joseph McKean (academic) (1776–1818), Boylston Professor of Rhetoric and Oratory at Harvard University, founder of Porcellian Club. Served as Berwick's second headmaster.
 John Holmes Burleigh (1822–77), U.S. Congressman from Maine, namesake of the Burleigh-Davidson Building, his former home
 John Noble Goodwin (1824–87) U.S. Congressman from Maine, Congressional Delegate from Arizona Territory, Chief Justice of Arizona Territory, and the first governor of Arizona
 Sarah Orne Jewett (1849–1909), novelist, author of A Country Doctor (1884), The Country of the Pointed Firs (1896)
 Guy Tripp (1865-1927), business executive and U.S. Army brigadier general
 Louis B. Costello (1876–1959), newspaper publisher
 Gladys Hasty Carroll (1904–99), novelist, author of As The Earth Turns (1933) and Dunnybrook (1943)
 Casey Coleman (1951–2006), radio broadcaster and play-by-by announcer for the Cleveland Indians
 Mike Eruzione (b. 1954), former National Hockey League player and captain of the 1980 U.S. Olympic Hockey Team
 Richard Corman (photographer) (b. 1954), portrait photographer.
 Sam Fuld (b. 1981), Major League Baseball player for the Oakland Athletics and General Manager for the Philadelphia Phillies, attended in 8th grade

References

External links
 The Berwick Academy website

Federal architecture in Maine
Renaissance Revival architecture in Maine
School buildings completed in 1791
Schools in York County, Maine
Educational institutions established in 1791
1791 establishments in Maine
School buildings on the National Register of Historic Places in Maine
Private high schools in Maine
Preparatory schools in Maine
Private elementary schools in Maine
Private middle schools in Maine
South Berwick, Maine
Historic districts on the National Register of Historic Places in Maine
National Register of Historic Places in York County, Maine
Richardsonian Romanesque architecture in Maine